The Louis Will House is a "high-style" Queen Anne style house at 714 N. McBride St. in Syracuse, New York.  It was listed on the National Register of Historic Places on November 10, 2009.

It was the home of Louis Will, Progressive Party mayor of Syracuse during 1914–16.  He was owner of a candle-making business.

The exterior of the house is built of brick on a sandstone foundation. Terra-cotta features decorate various parts of the house. A porch with turned wood elements wraps from the west facing front of the house around the south side. The most significant feature of the house is its stained glass windows, which are believed to be early works of the Tiffany studios in New York City.

Oddly, the architect is unknown, despite original plans for the house being available.

It faces on McBride Park and stands out as the pre-eminent home of the area.

References 

Houses on the National Register of Historic Places in New York (state)
Queen Anne architecture in New York (state)
Houses in Syracuse, New York
National Register of Historic Places in Syracuse, New York